São Brás or São Braz (Portuguese for Saint Blaise) may refer to:

In Brazil
São Brás, Alagoas, in Alagoas
São Brás do Suaçuí, in Minas Gerais
São Braz, Belém, a neighbourhood of Belém, Brazil
São Braz do Piauí, in Piauí

In Portugal
São Brás de Alportel, a municipality in the Faro District
São Brás (Amadora), a parish in the municipality of Amadora

In the Azores
 São Brás (Praia da Vitória), a civil parish in the municipality of Praia da Vitória
 São Brás (Ribeira Grande), a civil parish in the municipality of Ribeira Grande

In India
 São Brás, a parish in Gandaulim (Ilhas), Goa, India